Blakeney may refer to:

People
Blakeney (surname)

Places

England
Blakeney, Gloucestershire, a village
Blakeney, Norfolk, a village and civil parish
Blakeney Point, a nature reserve

North America
Blakeney, Ontario, Canada
Blakeney, Texas, United States, see National Register of Historic Places listings in Red River County, Texas
Blakeney Lake, Nova Scotia, Canada

Other uses
 Sir Percy Blakeney, hero of the novel The Scarlet Pimpernel, by Baroness Orczy
 Blakeney (horse), winner of the 1969 Epsom Derby

See also
 Blackening (disambiguation)
 Blakeley (disambiguation)
 Blakely (disambiguation)